Kilrossanty GAA is a Gaelic Athletic Association (GAA) club located in Lemybrien, County Waterford, Ireland. The club is named for the nearby village of Kilrossanty. It plays home games at Pairc Naomh Brid. Kilrossanty is one of the oldest GAA clubs in Waterford and one of the larger Gaelic Football clubs there.

They also play underage hurling and have fielded a number of adult hurling teams on many occasions. They won the Junior B Hurling title in 1990.and 2016 Defeating Mount Sion 1-20 to 07 

In the early days of the GAA, Kerry GAA wore red and green as their colours. In 1903, they traveled east to play a tournament in Dungarvan and inexplicably left the green and red jerseys at home. Percy Kirwan borrowed the green and gold kit off local club Kilrossanty Kerry GAA Liked the Jerseys as they Brought Them Luck.

Honours
Waterford Senior Football Championship 15
 1888, 1919, 1939, 1949, 1950, 1951, 1952, 1957, 1960, 1964, 1983, 1985, 1986, 1988, 1989
Waterford Junior Football Championships: 6
 1918, 1926, 1937, 1998, 2010, 2013
Waterford Minor Football Championships: 2
 2004, 2016(Div 3)
Waterford Under-21 Football Championships: 4
1983, 1992, 1993, 2011
Waterford Under-20 B Hurling Championships:1
2022Waterford Junior B Hurling Championships: 2
1990, 2016Senior Football League - Phelan Cup: 8
1956,1957,1982,1984,1987,1990,2011,2016Waterford Minor Hurling Division 3 Championships:''' 1
 2018

History
Kilrossanty was founded in 1886 and took part in the first Waterford Senior Football Championship that year. The club reached its first final in 1886 and reached the finals again the following year, before winning its first title in 1888, without recording a single score against them. Kilrossanty won fifteen Waterford Senior Football Titles. They hold the distinction of being the Waterford club to have held on to their senior status the longest without relegation to intermediate ranks. On winning the junior title in 1937, Kilrossanty was promoted to the senior grade, where they have remained ever since.
In 1888, Kilrossanty won their first senior football title, beating Fenor 0-3 to 0-0[1] in the final.

This crowning victory was a fruit of their perseverance. For, despite the short of history of the club at that point, they had lost back-to-back finals in ’86 and ’87. In a way, these back-to-back county final defeats baptised the team. For from this heartache, resolve was borne, and in the spring of 1888, hope flared anew.

This patience was rewarded as they rose from the ashes of ’86 and ‘87. In an unforgettable brilliance, they swept to coronation in ’88 with an unblemished six-game campaign. Their prestige that year was well-earned. In roughly 390 minutes of football, they did not once concede a single score. This is a feat that has come to define that historic first title and is undoubtedly one unparalleled in the county since, if not the country.

Notable players

  Declan Troy
  Mick Prendergast
  Jimineen Power
  Sean Ormonde
 Darren Mulhearne
Padraig Fitzgerald (WIT's Fitzgibbon hurler of the year 2022)

References

External links
 
 

Gaelic games clubs in County Waterford
Gaelic football clubs in County Waterford